Octagon is the second studio album by Dilate, released on June 24, 1997 by Hypnotic Records. The album was re-released in 2000 by Hypnotic as the first disc of the New Age...Spiritual Healing box set.

Music
Tracks from Octagon were promoted by Cleopatra Records and released on several various artists compilations. The composition "Shapeshifter" appeared on the compilations Area 51: The Roswell Incident released in 1997 by Purple Pyramid Records and again in 1999 on Ultimate Space Rock by Cleopatra. The album's lead track "Octagon" appeared on 1999 compilation In to the Mix III by Hypnotic Records.

Reception

Jim Brenholts of AllMusic gave Octagon a positive review, calling the album "almost two and a half hours of ambient bliss" and "deep sonic environmental minimalism." Brenholts concluded by saying "there are no flaws or gaps in this set; Wulf has covered it all" and recommended the music to listeners of John Foxx, Brannan Lane, Zero Ohms and Jeff Pearce.

Track listing

Personnel
Adapted from the Octagon liner notes.

Dilate
 Victor Wulf – keyboards

Production and additional personnel
 Michael Cripps – photography, design
 Judson Leach – mastering

Release history

References

External links 
 Octagon at Discogs (list of releases)
 Octagon at iTunes

1997 albums
Dilate (musical project) albums
Hypnotic Records albums